Joshua Navarro Sandí (born 11 March 1999) is a Costa Rican professional footballer who plays as a midfielder for Pérez Zeledón.

Club career

Pérez Zeledón
Navarro made his debut in the Liga FPD on 22 July 2018, in a 1–0 loss to Guadalupe.

On 15 June 2021, Navarro was loaned to Canadian Premier League side Forge FC.

References

External links

1999 births
Living people
Association football midfielders
Costa Rican footballers
People from Pérez Zeledón (canton)
Costa Rican expatriate footballers
Expatriate soccer players in Canada
Costa Rican expatriate sportspeople in Canada
Municipal Pérez Zeledón footballers
Forge FC players
Liga FPD players
Costa Rica youth international footballers